The First cabinet of Katrín Jakobsdóttir was formed on 30 November 2017, following the 2017 parliamentary election. The cabinet was led by Katrín Jakobsdóttir of the Left-Green Movement, who served as Prime Minister of Iceland.

The cabinet was a coalition government consisting the Independence Party, the Left-Green Movement and the Progressive Party. Together they held 33 of the 63 seats in the Parliament of Iceland and served as a majority government. In the cabinet, there were eleven ministers, where five were from the Independence Party, three were from the Left-Green Movement and three were from the Progressive Party. After the election in 2017 the parties had 35 seats in the parliament, but since then two MPs have left the Left-Green Movement.

Cabinet

See also
Government of Iceland
Cabinet of Iceland

References

2017 establishments in Iceland
Icelandic cabinets
Cabinets established in 2017
Left-Green Movement
Independence Party (Iceland)
Progressive Party (Iceland)
2021 disestablishments in Iceland
Cabinets disestablished in 2021